The Sony E 55-210mm F4.5-6.3 OSS is a variable maximum aperture telephoto zoom lens for the Sony E-mount, released by Sony on August 24, 2011. The lens is sometimes bundled with various Sony Alpha mirrorless cameras along with the Sony 16-50mm kit lens.

Build quality
The lens showcases a glossy black (or silver) plastic exterior with a pair of rubber focus and zoom rings. The barrel of the lens telescopes outward from the main lens body as it's zoomed in from 55mm to 210mm. However, the lens does not come with a zoom lock to help in combatting zoom creep.

Image quality
The lens tends to be slightly soft throughout its zoom range, with minimal pin-cushion distortion, vignetting, and chromatic aberration.

See also
List of Sony E-mount lenses

References

Camera lenses introduced in 2011
55-210